The 1925 Campbell Fighting Camels football team represented Campbell University during the 1925 college football season. They finished with a 2–0 record.

Schedule

References

Campbell
Campbell Fighting Camels football seasons
College football undefeated seasons
Campbell Fighting Camels football